HMS Wildfire is a Royal Naval Reserve unit in Northwood, North West London. Training over 100 reservists, HMS Wildfire is located within a purpose built training facility inside the national military tri-service HQ and NATO base.

History
Descended from a long a line of HMS Wildfires since the 1760s, the current unit was commissioned as HMS Northwood in 1957 to support the growing NATO Eastern Atlantic Command at Northwood.

In May 2000 HMS Northwood decommissioned and was commissioned as HMS Wildfire.

As part of the redevelopment of the base HMS Wildfire returned to the main base into a modern purpose built facility. On 11 June 2011, the Ships company formally marched from Brackenhill House to the Northwood base behind the RM Band Portsmouth and was inspected by Commander-in-Chief Fleet, Admiral Sir Trevor Soar.

Commanding Officer
The current Commanding Officer of HMS Wildfire is Lieutenant Commander Ian Dorward.

References

 

Royal Navy shore establishments